Saproamanita praeclara, or the playing field lepidella, is a species of fungus from South Africa.

Description 
Saproamanita praeclara is a robust, white mushroom. It is white with lemony yellow tinges. The cap starts off conical and hairless, but becomes convex and loosely hairy with time. It is sometimes slightly dented and hairless at the center. The margins of the cap are shaggy and hang down towards the stem. The cap does not have a noticeable scent.

It ranges from white to lemony yellow in colour. It becomes bulbous towards the base and is powdery and hairy near the top. It has a soapy scent.

The ring is hairy. The gills are free, deep and crowded. They are white or cream coloured when the organism is young and become yellow with age. The spore print is white.

Distribution and habitat 
Saproamanita praeclara grows in southern parts of the Western Cape of South Africa. It grows in rings in grassy areas (such as fields and lawns) and near woods.

References 

Amanitaceae